Club Deportivo Carranque is a football team based in Carranque in the autonomous community of Castilla-La Mancha. Founded in 1986, it plays in the 1ª Autonómica Preferente. Its stadium is Estadio Municipal with a capacity of 1,000 seats.

Season to season

3 season in Tercera División

External links
ffcm.es profile 
Futbolme.com profile 

Football clubs in Castilla–La Mancha
Association football clubs established in 1986
Divisiones Regionales de Fútbol clubs
1986 establishments in Spain
Province of Toledo